Pseudocyst of the auricle is a cutaneous condition characterized by a fluctuant, tense, noninflammatory swelling on the upper half of the ear.

See also 
 Verrucous cyst
 Cutaneous columnar cyst
 List of cutaneous conditions

References

Further reading

Epidermal nevi, neoplasms, and cysts